James V. “Jimmy” Crosby, Jr. (born 1952) is the former Secretary of the Florida Department of Corrections. He took over from Michael W. Moore. He was appointed by Florida governor Jeb Bush in 2003.

Jimmy was born and raised in Starke, Florida on August 15, 1952 and attended Bradford County High School and was one of the first desegregated graduating classes at Bradford High School. Crosby earned his Bachelor of Arts, Communication and Journalism, from the University of Florida, class of 1973 and early in his career became a City Commissioner and later Mayor of the City of Starke by the age of 28. From 2008 until 2010, Crosby obtained a Master of Theology, Doctorate of Ministry,
Doctorate of Theology, Doctorate of Philosophy in Biblical Studies all from the Jacksonville Baptist Theological Seminary. Crosby is also a certified public manager.   

Mr. Crosby joined the Florida Department of Corrections in 1975 and served as the warden at five major institutions, including Florida State Prison. He also served as Regional Director of Security and Institutional Management, Region II. He replaced George Denman as Region II director in 2001.

Mr. Crosby was heavily involved in Republican politics during his career, serving at one time as a congressional district chairman. Mr. Crosby was instrumental in the North Florida campaign for Jeb Bush’s successful race for Governor of Florida. 

In 2003, Mr. Crosby was appointed by Florida Governor, Jeb Bush as Secretary of the Department of Corrections overseeing a budget of $2 billion.  

Crosby was a popular warden and Secretary of the Department of Corrections. Under his leadership, the Department of Correction became more racially diverse and promoted minorities into more leadership roles. Mr. Crosby ushered in some much needed reforms to the Department and took a “hands on” approach to leadership.  

On February 10, 2006 Crosby resigned as Secretary of the Florida Department of Corrections. 

On July 5, 2006, it was reported that Crosby would plead guilty to accepting kickbacks. Two law enforcement officials close to the case also said that new charges were expected against almost a dozen current and former prison employees.

Governor Bush named James McDonough, Col. (ret) as interim secretary and McDonough was later given the job on a permanent basis. McDonough was a former Army colonel. He served as Florida's drug czar before taking on the job as the head of Florida's prison system, which oversaw at the time, 90,000 inmates. On February 7, 2008, he left his post as secretary of Florida's Department of Corrections. 

Crosby was serving an eight-year prison sentence in FCI Morgantown, a Federal Prison in West Virginia. Crosby was released on April 11, 2013.

In August of 2015, Dr. Crosby became President of the Jacksonville Baptist Theological Seminary. 

Since October of 2021, Dr. Crosby serves as the elected City Clerk of his beloved hometown of Starke, Florida.

References

State cabinet secretaries of Florida
1952 births
Living people
American prison wardens